The chief minister of Karnataka, formerly known as the chief minister of Mysore, is the chief executive officer of the government of the Indian state of Karnataka. As per the Constitution of India, the governor of Karnataka is the state's de jure head, but de facto executive authority rests with the chief minister, a template applicable to all other Indian states. Following elections to the Karnataka Legislative Assembly, the governor usually invites the political party (or a coalition of political parties) with a majority of assembly seats to form the government in the state. The governor appoints the chief minister, whose Council of Ministers is collectively responsible to the assembly. Given that he/she has the confidence of the assembly, the chief minister's term is for five years, renewable, and is subject to no term limits.

Historically, this office replaced that of the diwan of Mysore of the erstwhile Kingdom of Mysore with India's constitution into a republic. Since 1947, there have been a total of twenty-three chief ministers of Mysore (as the state was known before 1 November 1973) or chief ministers of Karnataka. A majority of them belonged to the Indian National Congress (INC) party, including the inaugural officeholder K. C. Reddy. The longest-serving chief minister, D. Devaraj Urs, held the office for over seven years in the 1970s. INC's Veerendra Patil had the largest gap between two terms (over eighteen years). One chief minister, H. D. Deve Gowda, went on to become the eleventh prime minister of India, whereas another, B. D. Jatti, served as the country's fifth vice president. B. S. Yediyurappa who was the first chief minister from the Bharatiya Janata Party (BJP), served as the chief minister of the state for four terms in 2007, 2008, 2018 and 2019, the only one to do so in the history of Karnataka. In total, Yediyurappa ruled the state for 5 years, 75 days and went on to be the fourth longest-serving chief minister after D. Devaraj Urs, S. Nijalingappa, and Ramakrishna Hegde. S. R. Bommai was the chief minister from the Janata Parivar, whose son Basavaraj Bommai, too, became chief minister from BJP. There have been six instances of president's rule in Karnataka, most recently from 2007 to 2008. The incumbent chief minister is Basavaraj Bommai from the BJP, sworn in on 28 July 2021.

Chief ministers of Coorg State

Chief ministers of Mysore State

Chief ministers of Karnataka

Timeline

See also
 Diwan of Mysore
 List of Diwans of Mysore
 List of deputy chief ministers of Karnataka

Notes

Footnotes

References

 
Chief Ministers
Karnataka
Karnataka politics-related lists